Dr. Ágnes Molnár (born May 12, 1956) is a Hungarian politician, member of the National Assembly (MP) from Fidesz Győr-Moson-Sopron County Regional List from 2006 to 2014, and her party's national list since 2014. She served as Secretary of State for National Development between June 2, 2010 and June 29, 2012.

Career
She attended to the Radnóti Miklós Secondary School in Szeged and passed the secondary school final examinations in 1974. She graduated as a medical doctor from the University of Medical Sciences of Szeged with laudable diploma in 1980. She began her work in the children's ward of the State Sanatorium in Sopron in 1980. She worked for the children's ward of Erzsébet hospital in Sopron from 1982. She accomplished her special studies of paediatrics and infant medicine with excellent results in 1985. Parallel to her duties of the children's ward she also worked as for years as a paediatrician for neighbouring settlements and also the medical treatment for children suffering from a renal disease. She helped establishing the County health children's home. She was also responsible for years as a medical doctor for state cared children in two children's home of Sopron. She began a private practice with her husband in 1992. She is a director of Arcus ker. Ltd. from 1998 and managing director of Régióturizmus Ltd. from 2001.

She has been supporter from 1997 and member of Fidesz since 2003. She had been member os the local General Assembly of Sopron, chairperson of the Health and Social Committee from 2002 to 2006. From 2003 she helped the party as a coordinator of the party president and then as a political director Northern-Transdanubia. She secured a seat in Parliament during the 2006 parliamentary election from Győr-Moson-Sopron County Regional List. She was elected member of the Committee on Health Affairs on 30 May 2006. She is a member of the Committee of Welfare since May 2014.

References

1956 births
Living people
Hungarian pediatricians
Women members of the National Assembly of Hungary
Fidesz politicians
Members of the National Assembly of Hungary (2006–2010)
Members of the National Assembly of Hungary (2010–2014)
Members of the National Assembly of Hungary (2014–2018)
Members of the National Assembly of Hungary (2018–2022)
Members of the National Assembly of Hungary (2022–2026)
People from Szeged
21st-century Hungarian women politicians